Turatia yemenensis is a moth in the family Autostichidae. It was described by Georg Derra in 2008. It is found in Yemen.

References

Moths described in 2008
Turatia